Pone Kingpetch, born Mana Seedokbuab (February 12, 1935 – March 31, 1982), was a Thai professional boxer and three time world flyweight champion.

Life and career

He became Thailand's first world boxing champion on April 16, 1960, when he defeated Pascual Pérez of Argentina at Lumphini Boxing Stadium in Bangkok for the world flyweight championship. In his second title defense he lost the title to Fighting Harada of Japan on October 10, 1962, via 11th-round knockout. Pone Kingpetch regained the world championship after outpointing Harada in a rematch on January 12, 1963. However it again proved to be short reign as Hiroyuki Ebihara knocked Pone out in the first round to become the new Flyweight champion of the world. In On February 14, 1963, with the creation of World Boxing Council, Kingpetch was named the first WBC flyweight champion. Several other champions had been named in some divisions while in others, the reigning champions fought for the inaugural title. In his final title win he defeated Ebihara in a rematch on January 23, 1964, to become a three time flyweight champion. After the win in Japan he travelled to Italy to defend his title against Salvatore Burruni, and lost a 15-round decision to the Italian in his final world title fight. He retired from the sport altogether in 1966 at the age of 31. Kingpetch died on March 31, 1982, from pneumonia and heart failure, He was 47.

Professional boxing record

See also 
List of flyweight boxing champions

References

External links

 Pone Kingpetch - CBZ Profile
 National Boxing Association's Quarterly Ratings: 1960 - BoxRec
 National Boxing Association's Quarterly Ratings: 1961 - BoxRec
 National Boxing Association's Quarterly Ratings: 1962 - BoxRec

|-

 

|-

|-

|-

|-

|-

|-

|-

|-

|-

1935 births
1982 deaths
Flyweight boxers
World flyweight boxing champions
World Boxing Association champions
World Boxing Council champions
The Ring (magazine) champions
Pone Kingpetch
Pone Kingpetch